Darrin Verhagen is an Australian-born composer of dark ambient and gothic music. He has adopted several different monikers for his recorded output, depending on the genre including Shinjuku Thief, Shinjuku Filth and Professor Richmann. . After his first album Bloody Tourist was released, Verhagen founded Dorobo Records which he has continued to issue his music through. He has composed music for Australia's premiere arts companies (including Chunky Move, Australian Dance Theatre, Lucy Guerin, Malthouse Theatre, Melbourne Theatre Company, Sydney Theatre Company, Daniel Schlusser Ensemble, Showtime Movie Channel, Patricia Piccinini, and SBS Television). He currently works as a senior lecturer in Sound + Vision in the Digital Media program, researcher at AkE (Audiokinetic Experiments) Lab RMIT University in Melbourne, with his work based in multisensory integration. He collaborates with other practitioners in installation works as (((20 Hz))).

Shinjuku Thief
Shinjuku Thief is an experimental recording project of Darrin Verhagen, that could be described as dark ambient or gothic industrial. Shinjuku Thief began in 1992 as a trio, consisting of Verhagen, Charles Tétaz and François Tétaz. Eventually, Verhagen became the mainstay. Shinjuku Thief's first LP, Bloody Tourist, was released on the Extreme label. Subsequent LPs were released on Verhagen's own Dorobo label. Verhagen's side-project, Shinjuku Filth, released music in the industrial music genre.

Discography 
Solo
Soft Ash (1997, Dorobo)

as Shinjuku Thief
Bloody Tourist (1992, Extreme)
The Scribbler (1992, Dorobo)
The Witch Hammer (1993, Dorobo)
The Witch Hunter (1995, Dorobo)
The Witch Haven (2002, Dorobo)
Matte Black (2004, Dorobo)
Devoltion (2006, Dorobo)
Boys in the Trees OST (2016, Liberation)

as Shinjuku Filth
Junk (1995, Dorobo)
Raised by Wolves (1997, Dorobo)
Zero/Stung (1999, Dorobo)

as Professor Richmann
Succulent Blue Sway (1995, Dorobo)

References

External links 
 
 Staff homepage

Living people
Australian male composers
Australian composers
Australian electronic musicians
Musicians from Melbourne
1967 births
Australian people of Flemish descent